Kao Sheng-mei (born 27 January 1969), also known as Sammi Kao, is a Taiwanese pop singer of Bunun and Han Chinese descent. She won "Best Mandarin Artist" at the 1992 4th Golden Melody Awards.

Kao rose to fame after singing the theme songs of 5 television dramas based on Chiung Yao's novels from 1989 to 1991, like Mute Wife (1990) and Three Flowers (1990). Her rendition of the opening theme of New Legend of Madame White Snake (1992) made her well known in mainland China, where she relocated to and is currently based.

Actress Sharon Kao is her niece.

References

1969 births
Living people
Taiwanese Mandopop singers
Musicians from Kaohsiung
Bunun people
20th-century Taiwanese women singers
21st-century Taiwanese women singers